The Nihon Phoenix football program, established in 1940, represents Nihon University in college football. Nihon is a member of the Kantoh Collegiate American Football Association. Nihon Phoenix football has been a powerhouse in Japan's college football along with the Kwansei Gakuin University Fighters for four decades.

Features 
Nihon has won the Japanese collegiate championships 17 times, including 5 in a row when Mikio Shinokake was the team's head coach. Shinokake adopted the shotgun formation as the team's basic offensive formation. He often had played the team's best athlete as a quarterback in the formation, and the QB would play the dual role of both quarterback and tailback. The strategy worked very well because the size and the power of Japanese defenders had not been big nor strong enough to injure the QB, making the defenders confused whether the quarterback intended to pass the ball or keep the ball for qb draw. Nihon sometimes used the Dragonfly formation which is a variation of the shotgun formation where two quarterbacks are aligned at the same time in the formation. These QBs also play the dual role of QB and tailback, then it is almost the same as if four players were aligned in the backfield. Nihon scored two touchdowns using the formation against the College of William & Mary at the Ivy Bowl in 1993.

Controversy 
The Nihon University Phoenix has played friendly exhibition games against the Kwansei Gakuin University Fighters for forty years, and during an exhibition match on May 6, 2018, a defensive player of Phoenix tackled a quarterback of Fighters from behind at least two seconds after throwing an incomplete-pass. The quarterback was forced to leave the game. Also, the defender committed three fouls in the match. However, he was in tears at the bench after substituted off. Just after the match, the Phoenix head coach commented on the defender's plays as if he approved of the fouls or encouraged the players to commit them. This dangerous illegal late-hit and the coach's comment stirred a national controversy.

Ex-NFL line-backer Masafumi Kawaguchi pointed out that he'd never seen anything like the late-hit that became a problem. The Kwansei Gakuin University formally protested to the Nihon University, and accused Nihon of intentionally trying to hurt the quarterback. Daichi Suzuki, the chief of the government's Japan Sports Agency, launched an inquiry and called the play into question.

The quarterback was damaged in his spine. The defender who injured him was obviously ordered to make dirty tackles by Nihon Phoenix coaches, and later admitted it in public according to his conscience. The head coach of Nihon, nevertheless, denied that he had ordered his players to play dirty and resigned as coach without giving veracity in explain. Anger spread in nation-wide.

Reporters of New York Times speculated that this controversy related to deep-rooted cultural dynamics including what the Japanese call “power hara”.

References

External links
 

American football teams established in 1940
American football in Japan
1940 establishments in Japan